The 2019 Worthing Borough Council election took place on 2 May 2019 to elect members of Worthing Borough Council. This was on the same day as other local elections. A third of the council was up for election, meaning a total of 11 councillors were elected from council's wards, there being no election in Durrington and Northbrook in this cycle.

Council results

Ward results

Broadwater ward

Castle ward

Central ward

Gaisford ward

Goring ward

Heene ward

Marine ward

Offington ward

Salvington ward

Selden ward

Tarring ward

References

2019 English local elections
2019
May 2019 events in the United Kingdom
2010s in West Sussex